Derek Hames is a Texas-based record producer, singer, songwriter, and musician.

Biography and career 
Born October 13, 1979 in Fort Worth, Texas to radio icon Randy Hames and wife Cindy Hames.  Derek moved to Houston at an early age and began as a teenager playing in area bands Three-Car Garage, Clockwork Orange, and Red Scare with current Randy Rogers Band guitarist Geoffrey Hill before writing, producing, and releasing an album with college-rock band Potter's Field in 1997.

Shortly after moving back to Dallas-Fort Worth Metroplex for college at TCU, Derek co-founded American rock band 60 Foot Sammy in 1999.  After being nominated for Dallas Rock Band of the Year, the band worked with Grammy-nominated British record producer John Ravenhall and released their debut album, "Falling From Five Stories," internationally on London-based label Right Recordings. Their single, "Do I," garnered airplay on BBC Radio and developed a worldwide cult following.

After stints in Texas bands Threewise, E-Flat Johnny, and New Southern Democrats, Hames formed Edgewater Studios and Edgewater Music Group in 2009 with fellow Sammy veteran and audio engineer John Shelton and father/Marconi Award winning broadcaster Randy Hames (formerly Irv Harrigan of KILT-FMs Hudson & Harrigan Show in Houston).

As a record producer, Hames has produced records for more than 70 artists worldwide, and his company's releases are distributed through The Orchard, a division of Sony Music Entertainment.

References

External links 
 Facebook 
 MySpace

Record producers from Texas
Living people
1979 births
People from Fort Worth, Texas
Musicians from Texas
American rock musicians